Below is a list of events affecting Japanese television in 2023.

Events

Ongoing

New series and returning shows

Ending

Special events and milestone episodes

Deaths

References 

2023 in Japanese television